De Cock Late Night, also called DCLN, was a Belgian talk radio show on the Flemish radio MNM presented by Tom De Cock. It was broadcast each Wednesday from 21.00 to 24.00 at night. The first episode aired on January 5, 2009. The final episode in June 2012. Until March 2010 the show was also broadcast on Monday, Tuesday and Thursday.

Each episode one or two topics are discussed during the first hour of broadcast. From 23.00 on the show continues about a subject chosen from a pile list of suggestions. Most of the presentation was improvised, though "Sh*t On Tha Radio" and "Geen Nieuws om 23 uur met Tom De Cock" ("No News at 23 o'clock with Tom De Cock") were recurring items.

In October 2011 "De Cock Late Night" received a permanent guest host and show: "S.O.S. Karolien", presented by Karolien Debecker. This program was dedicated to helping out listeners with problems. It was only broadcast when De Cock was absent due to vacation, illness or presenting "De Ochtendshow" during holidays.

In 2012 "De Cock Last Night" was cancelled. He returned in the fall with a new show, "Planeet De Cock".

External links 
 MNM

Belgian radio programmes
2009 radio programme debuts
2012 radio programme endings
Talk radio programs